Atys (Attis) is a 1675 tragédie en musique — described in a 1708 revival as a tragédie mise en musique and today considered a tragédie lyrique, a French form of opera — in a prologue and five acts by Jean-Baptiste Lully to a libretto by Philippe Quinault after Ovid's Fasti.

It was premiered for the royal court on 10 January the following year by Lully's Académie Royale de Musique (Paris Opera) at the Château de Saint-Germain-en-Laye. The first public performance took place in April 1676 at the Théâtre du Palais-Royal.

Although Atys was met with indifference by Paris audiences, it became known as "the king's opera" because of Louis XIV's fondness for it; it was repeated for him in 1678, 1682 and 1708.

Roles

Plot and music outline

The French style of opera, established in the 1670s by Lully, was in five acts with a prologue.

Prologue

Lully's prologues normally served to comment on current events at the court of Louis XIV in a way that flattered the king. When the opera was premiered in 1676, France was at war with the Netherlands, and the French winter campaign had resulted in the tragic death of Henri de la Tour. Louis XIV was waiting for the fairer spring weather to arrive so that he could invade Flanders.

The overture is in standard French overture form and style as developed by Lully, featuring three sections: a slow section in duple meter and pompous dotted rhythms in G minor, followed by a faster middle section and concluded with a second slow section ending with a Picardy third.

The scene for the prologue is at the Palace of the allegorical character Time. A chorus of Hours of the Day and Night sing the praises of a 'hero' (Louis XIV) in "Ses Justes loix, ses grands exploits" ("His just laws, his great exploits"). Flore, the goddess of spring and her nymphs arrive and discuss the arrival of spring and perform dances. A Zephyr, on the other hand, laments the coming of spring and the battles that will follow. Just as the hero is about to leave for battle, Melpomene arrives and, in a gesture functioning as a transition to Act I, proceeds to tell the story of Atys in the recitative "Retirez vous." Iris then enters and relays the message from the goddess Cybèle in "Cybèle veut que Flore." This is followed by more dances and the chorus "Préparez vous de nouvelles festes."

Act I

Scene 1 takes place at the holy mountain of the goddess Cybèle. Atys sings the air "Allons, allons" at a brisk tempo to wake up the Phrygians so that they can give a proper welcome to Cybèle. Idas mocks him in Scene 2, suggesting his motivation might be too much love for the goddess in the air "Vous veillez lorsque tout sommeil." Sangaride and Doris arrive in Scene 3. Sangaride is betrothed to the king of the Phrygians, Celenus, and pretends to be excited for the wedding, especially because the goddess Cybèle will attend. The quartet sings "Allons, allons accourez tous." In scene 4, we learn that Sangaride is in fact unhappy about her forthcoming wedding, for she is really in love with Atys. To convey this, she sings the lament "Atys est trop heureux" based on the diatonically descending tetrachord model (in this case in D minor: D-C-Bb-A) that had been established by Claudio Monteverdi in his Lament of the Nymph. During Scenes 5 and 6, Atys finds Sangaride lamenting and confesses his love for her in the recitative dialogue "Sangaride ce jour est un grand jour pour vous." Sangaride is astonished by his declaration of love. Atys and Sangaride sing the duet "Commençons, commençons" and are soon joined by the chorus of Phrygians in Scene 7. After some dances by the Phrygians, Cybèle appears in Scene 8 and invites all into her temple in "Venez tous dans mon temple." The chorus of Phrygians motivate themselves to comply her wishes with "Nous devons nous animer."
 
Act II

The scene of Act II is inside the temple of the goddess Cybèle.

Celenus and Atys both announce their desire to be selected as the high priest of Cybèle in Scene 1's recitative "N'avancez plus loin." Atys then sings the air "Qu'un indifférent est heureux." In Scene 2, Cybèle arrives and states that she chooses Atys as the high priest because she has secretly loved him. In fact, it was because of her love for Atys that she is attending the wedding. Celenus graciously accepts her decision. The chorus of Nations sings "Célébrons la gloire immortelle" to celebrate Cybèle's choice, followed by a dance by the Zephyrs, which concludes the act in only four scenes.

Act III

The scene changes to the palace of the Sacrificateur of Cybèle where Atys is alone.

This act includes a sommeil (sleep): a type of scene that had been established in Venetian opera. Such scenes were especially useful because they could place a character into a vulnerable position for a variety of potential dramatic purposes. For example, the sleeping character could be vulnerable to attack, brainwashing, or might reveal secret thoughts in the altered state of consciousness. Although many Venetian traditions were not appreciated by the French, Lully and his librettist Quinnault clearly accepted the sleep scene type.

During Scene 1, Atys contemplates his unfortunate dilemma due to his love for Sangaride (who is engaged to King Celenus against her will) in the air "Que servent les faveurs." He is soon joined by Doris and Idas in Scenes 2 and 3, to whom he expresses concerns. In an uncommon outburst in Lullian opera, he exclaims "Mais quoi trahir le Roy!" (But, to betray the king!) Scene 4 is the sommeil described above, in which Cybèle causes him to fall asleep. The allegorical character Le Sommeil sings "Dormons, dormons tous" after a lengthy instrumental introduction featuring gentle music in G minor scored for a pair of flutes, violins, and basso continuo. Once asleep, Atys is first met by a chorus of Pleasant Dreams that sing of love followed by Bad Dreams who remind him that there are consequences for deceiving the gods. After this lengthy scene, Atys awakens in Scene 5 with Cybèle at his side attempting to console him. Sangaride arrives in Scene 6 and begs Cybèle to stop her wedding to King Celenus because she does not love him. Atys, confused, intervenes on Sangaride's behalf. This upsets Cybèle because she too loves Atys and has bestowed the title of high priest on him. When she is left alone with Melissa in Scene 7, she sings the lament "L'ingrat Atys," also based on the chromatically descending tetrachord in A minor (A-G#-G-F#-F-E). Unlike Sangaride's earlier lament in Act I, there is only one presentation of the tetrachord at the beginning rather than a repeated pattern. In Scene 8, Cybèle is left alone and performs the slow air "Espoir si cher si doux."

Act IV

This act is set in the palace of the River Sangar with Atys and Sangaride alone.

Scene 1 commences immediately with a dialogue between Sangaride and Atys. She has interpreted Atys's confusion as love for Cybèle and laments in front of Doris and Idas who interject various duets. During Scene 2, King Celenus addresses Sangaride affectionately in "Belle nymphe." He realizes that she does not love him and is only doing so to obey her father. Atys arrives in Scene 3 and hears the conversation. He and Sangaride are left alone in Scene 4 and engaged in a somewhat heated discussion involving rapid alternation between recitative and air styles. Atys assures Sangaride that he loves her and they swear to be faithful to each other. Sangaride's father approaches at the beginning of Scene 5. With his power as the high priest of Cybèle, Atys orders Sangaride's father to cancel the wedding to King Celenus. The River of Sangar approves Sangaride's choice in a chorus "Nous approuvons votre choix," followed by "Que l'on chante." A jubilant dance suite and choral numbers conclude the act.

Act V

The final act takes place in the pleasant gardens.

King Celenus finds out that the wedding plans have been cancelled and he confronts Cybèle in a lengthy recitative dialogue in Scene 1. Cybèle is not happy about the situation either. Because Atys has deceived the gods, Cybèle resolves to punish both him and Sangaride. As Atys and Sangaride enter in Scene 2, Cybèle and Celanus begin scolding them with a duet: "Venez vous livrer au supplice" that effectively becomes a dialogue in which the two pairs sing in opposition alternating recitative and air delivery styles. For punishment, Cybèle blinds Atys with a magical spell. Scene 3 opens with a furious instrumental prelude, followed by a dialogue ("Ciel! Quelle vapeur m'environne!") between Atys and Sangaride. A chorus concludes the scene with "Atys, Atys, lui-même." In Scene 4, Atys plans to commit suicide as a result of the tragic loss of his vision. Again the chorus finishes with "Atys, Atys, lui-même." To prevent his suicide, Cybèle intervenes in Scene 5 and transforms him into a tree. In the remaining portion of the opera (Scenes 6–7), Cybèle is left to celebrate her vengeance, yet lament the love she has lost.

Recordings
 1987 (audio): Guy de Mey, tenor (Atys); Guillemette Laurens, mezzo-soprano (Cybèle); Agnès Mellon, soprano (Sangaride); Jean-François Gardeil, baritone (Célénus); Chœur et Orchestre "Les Arts Florissants", William Christie, conductor. Harmonia Mundi 3 CDs, 2 hr 51 mins. Recorded Studio 103 de la Maison de Radio France, January 1987. .
 2011 (video): Bernard Richter (Atys); Stéphanie d'Oustrac (Cybèle); Emmanuelle de Negri (Sangaride); Nicolas Rivenq (Célénus); Marc Mauillon (Idas); Sophie Daneman (Doris); Jaël Azzaretti (Mélisse); Paul Agnew (Dieu de Sommeil); Cyril Auvity (Morphée); Bernard Deletré (Le Temps, le fleuve Sangar); Compagnie Fêtes galantes et Gil Isoart de l'Opéra National de Paris (dancers); Chœur et orchestre Les Arts Florissants; William Christie, conductor. FRA Musica, 195 minutes (opera, a recreation of the 1987 production by stage director Jean-Marie Villégier in which the prologue has been greatly modified; recorded live at the Salle Favart in Paris in May 2011); 100 minutes (bonus, "Five Visions of Atys", including interviews with Christie and  Villégier, among others). .

See also
Cibell

References
Notes

Sources
 Original libretto: Atys, Tragédie en Musique. Ornée d'Entrées de Ballet, de Machines, & de Changements de Theatre, Paris, Ballard, 1676 (accessible for free online at Gallica - B.N.F.)
 Brooks, William S.; Norman, Buford (April 2005). "Introduction" to Chronologie critique et analytique des représentations d'opéra à Paris et à la cour des débuts jusqu'en 1723. Centre de musique baroque de Versailles. View at the CMBR website; accessed 23 June 2012.
 Rosow, Lois. "Atys (i)", Grove Music Online, ed. L. Macy (accessed July 24, 2006), grovemusic.com (subscription access).
 Pitou, Spire. The Paris Opéra - An Encyclopedia of Operas, Ballets, Composers, and Performers - Rococo and Romantic 1715-1815, Westport (Connecticut), Greenwood Press, 1985

External links
 
 Libretto (The Hague, 1717) at Internet Archive

Operas by Jean-Baptiste Lully
Tragédies en musique
French-language operas
Operas
1676 operas
Operas based on classical mythology
Works based on Fasti (poem)
Operas based on works by Ovid